Jibneh Arabieh (also jibni) is a soft white cheese found all over the Middle East. It is particularly popular in the Persian Gulf region. The cheese has a mild taste similar to feta but less salty. The heritage of the product started with Bedouins using goat or sheep milk; however, current practice is to use cow's milk to make the cheese. Jibneh Arabieh is used for cooking, or simply as a table cheese. 

Jibni is an ingredient in cheese-filled pastries such as knafeh.

See also
 Akkawi cheese
 Nabulsi cheese
 List of cheeses

References

External links
 Cheese.com

Middle Eastern cheeses
Mediterranean cuisine
Levantine cuisine
Arab cuisine
Cow's-milk cheeses
Goat's-milk cheeses
Sheep's-milk cheeses